Second Chance is a 1953 Technicolor crime film directed by Rudolph Maté.  The picture, shot on location in Mexico in 3D, features Robert Mitchum, Linda Darnell, and Jack Palance. It is notable as the first RKO film produced in 3D.

Plot
A mob bookkeeper (played by Milburn Stone) is confronted, shot, and killed by the utterly ruthless hitman Cappy Gordon (Jack Palance), under orders from the notorious gangster Vic Spilato, who is currently under investigation by the U.S. Senate. Cappy then heads for San Cristóbal, a bustling town in an unspecified Latin American country, with plans to deliver a similar fate to Spilato's estranged girlfriend, the singer Clare Shepperd (Linda Darnell), who is trying to escape her past connections with Spilato.

Meanwhile, Russ Lambert (played by Robert Mitchum), an American prizefighter, also heads to San Cristóbal to take his mind off his recent, accidental killing of an opponent in the ring. Lambert prepares to fight a local challenger named Rivera. At the same time, Clare, under the alias "Clare Sinclair," seeks out a bar-owner named Felipe who was once criminally connected with her gangster ex, and sells him a valuable pair of earrings. Clare watches as Lambert wins the match against Rivera and finds herself attracted to Lambert, though she has mistakenly bet on Rivera. Soon afterward, Cappy's hunt for Clare ends, and he expresses his love for her, promising to spare her life if she will run off with him. Instead, Clare flees for Felipe's bar and threatens to expose the owner to Cappy, unless Felipe will persuade Lambert to meet her at the isolated Posado de Don Pascual. Felipe does so and Clare and Lambert meet there, tentatively beginning a relationship with romantic possibilities, though Clare does not tell Lambert about her stormy past.

Clare and Lambert take an aerial tramway to La Cumbre ("The Summit"), an idyllic but almost completely secluded mountaintop village, and they enjoy a stroll through the town, unaware that Cappy is pursuing them. They watch a sexually provocative dance, performed by a young man and woman, whose older husband, Vasco (Rodolfo Hoyos Jr.), drags her off in a jealous rage, kills her, and is consequently arrested. Upset by the event, Clare and Lambert head toward a hotel where they spend the night, since the aerial lift has ended service for the night and there is no other way in or out of La Cumbre. Lambert and Clare kiss, and Lambert reveals he knows of her history with Spilato.

When Clare is alone at the hotel, Cappy violently barges into her room and makes her promise to meet him later on the cable car, where, he claims, they will reunite and run away together, otherwise he will kill Lambert. In the hotel bar Lambert is introduced to the superficially friendly Cappy, who has been using the alias "Mr. Walters" at the hotel. To save Lambert, Clare gives him the slip and goes to the cable car but Lambert finding her room empty follows and catches the car just in time. The car is also being used by local police to transport Vasco, the murderous husband from the previous night, back down to San Cristóbal. On the journey down Clare claims she has simply changed her mind and wants to finish with Lambert though he doesn’t believe her.

At an intermediate stopping point on the mountain Cappy is waiting and again threatens Clare who seems to be about to throw herself down the mountain but then faints. She is carried back on board by Lambert and they all continue the cable car journey.

High above a deep abyss, one of two main cables suddenly snaps in the middle of the cable car's journey, jolting the car to a halt and sending the car's engineer plummeting to his death. Clare, Lambert, Cappy, Vasco, and several other passengers are left stranded in midair, and the remaining cable begins to fray, threatening to send them all hurtling to their doom. There is a possibility that one of the passengers could swing from the rope to a nearby cliff, and then run back into the town of La Cumbre to send for two emergency lifts. These lifts, which are much smaller than the cable car, can be guided right alongside the car, but they can only carry so much weight; in fact, the conductor calculates that three passengers will have to be left behind and will surely die when the second cable breaks, probably within the next few minutes.

Vasco volunteers, and the police officer escorting him allows him to do so because Vasco's young son is in the cable car. Vasco, however, swings into the cliff too hard, causing him to smash into the rocks and perish. Lambert volunteers for the task next and succeeds. He returns with the first of the two emergency lifts, but, before Clare and others can board it, Cappy suddenly grabs a police handgun and wounds the officer. He then attempts to board the lift, taking only himself and Clare, but Lambert attacks him. Cappy and Lambert then fight until, finally, one of Lambert's expert punches sends Cappy tumbling over the railing to his death. The remaining passengers board the two aerial lifts and get away seconds before the cable parts, dropping the cable car into the abyss.

Cast

 Robert Mitchum as Russ Lambert
 Linda Darnell as Clare Shepperd, alias Clare Sinclair
 Jack Palance as Cappy Gordon, alias Mr. Walters
 Roy Roberts as Charley Malloy
 Dan Seymour as Felipe, manager of a bar
 Fortunio Bonanova as Mandy, hotel owner
 Sandro Giglio as Cable Car Conductor
 Reginald Sheffield as Mr. Woburn, English tourist

 Margaret Brewster as Mrs. Woburn, English tourist
 Rodolfo Hoyos Jr. as Vasco, murderous husband
 Richard Vera as Pablo, Vasco's son
 Maurice Jara as Fernando, groom
 Judy Walsh as Maria, bride
 Salvador Baguez as Officer Hernandez
 Milburn Stone as Edward Dawson, Vic Spilato's bookkeeper
 Abel Fernández as Rivera, a boxer from San Cristóbal

Background
Second Chance is RKO Radio's first foray into the world of 3-D film, a prevalent cinema fad in the 1950s, and it featured their top stars.  Bad guy Jack Palance is fresh from his critically well-regarded work on Shane (1953). The picture is also the first Hollywood 3-D feature shot on a foreign location.

Critic Jeff Stafford believes the 3-D format was often unjustly maligned and in the early 1950s, was on the verge of "moving beyond the exploitable 'in your face' aspects" into more creative uses of the technology when the fad died.  He makes the case that the final scenes of Second Chance were "much more intense in 3-D when the depth of field and spatial relationships create[d] a genuine sense of vertigo."

According to critic Bosley Crowther, the screenplay was inspired by an aerial tramway accident that occurred in Rio de Janeiro circa 1951. Crowther wrote, "Except for one man being killed in an attempt to go for help via a rope and the slugging melee on the platform, this could almost be the Rio episode."

Filming locations
The film was shot entirely in Mexico, including: Cuernavaca, Morelos and Taxco, Guerrero.

Reception

Critical response
Bosley Crowther, film critic for The New York Times, was not impressed with the film's story but was captured by the thrilling ending, writing, "The build-up to the aerial adventure is not only synthetic but slow...the development of a romance between Mr. Mitchum and Linda Darnell...is mechanical and routine. But once they get aboard that tramway—Mr. Mitchum and Miss Darnell, coming down off the mountain and trailed by Mr. Palance—the drama begins to crackle. And once that cable snaps, the picture becomes a welter of cliff-hanging terror and suspense. Every little movement of the tramway, hanging up there by a thread, causes the acrophobe to tremble. And there is plenty of movement, indeed."

A reviewer for Time magazine, while calling 3-D "a novel gimmick," lauded the performance of Jack Palance, writing, "This man Palance keeps the show as well as Linda on the move. A rivet-eyed, onetime prelim fighter from the Pennsylvania coal country, Palance (né Palahniuk)  gave terrifying performances in Shane (1953) and Sudden Fear, (1952) has since become the hottest heavy in Hollywood. His face alone, as thin and cruel as a rust-pitted spade, is enough to-frighten a strong man; and to make matters worse, he seems to emit hostile energy, like something left overnight in a plutonium pile."

See also
 List of 3D films

References

External links
 
 
 
 

1953 films
1953 crime drama films
1953 3D films
American 3D films
Color film noir
Films scored by Roy Webb
Films with screenplays by D. M. Marshman Jr.
RKO Pictures films
American crime drama films
1950s English-language films
1950s American films